Mariano Zabaleta was the defending champion, but did not compete this year.

Rubén Ramírez Hidalgo won the title by defeating qualifier David Marrero 6–3, 6–1 in the final.

Seeds

Draw

Finals

Top half

Bottom half

References

External links
 Main Draw (ATP)
 Qualifying Draw (ATP)
 ITF tournament profile

La Serena